Samuel Blighton Robinson (born 1878) was an English professional footballer who played as a full-back.

References

1878 births
Footballers from Grimsby
English footballers
Association football fullbacks
Humber Rovers F.C. players
Grimsby Rovers F.C. players
Grimsby Town F.C. players
Grimsby Rangers F.C. players
Grimsby St John's F.C. players
English Football League players
Year of death missing